Circuba is Cuba's national circus and is associated with the Cuban National Circus School founded on June 6, 1968.

Members of the Circuba company have to first complete the normal academic course work required of all Cuban students before they can hope to be accepted for the four-year program of rigorous training in the circus arts. 

It consists of about twenty artists, aged between 19 and 30. Twenty-one artists graduated in 1979.

References

External links 
 Video interview of Roberto Pérez Morell on Havana-Cultura

Cuban contemporary artists
Performing arts in Cuba
Circuses